Marie Egner (25 August 1850, Bad Radkersburg - 31 March 1940, Vienna) was an Austrian painter.

Life 
Egner was born on 25 August 1850 in Bad Radkersburg, Austria. She took her first drawing lessons in Graz with Hermann von Königsbrunn, then went to Düsseldorf from 1872 to 1875, where she studied with Carl Jungheim. In 1882, she went to Vienna to live with her mother, but spent her summers at the art colony in Plankenberg Castle, near Neulengbach, where she took lessons with Emil Jakob Schindler until 1887. A study trip to England followed from 1887 to 1889. Shortly after, her first exhibition was held at the Vienna Künstlerhaus. She also exhibited in Germany and England.

Egner  exhibited her work at The Woman's Building at the 1893 World's Columbian Exposition in Chicago, Illinois. Along with Tina Blau and Olga Wisinger-Florian she was part of the Austrian ".
Egner established an art school for women, but had to give it up in 1910, for health reasons. After World War I, she became a member of the Austrian Association of Women Artists (VBKÖ). In 1926, the group held a major retrospective exhibition of her work. After 1930, she began to lose her eyesight and withdrew from public life.

She died on 31 March 1940 in Vienna.

Legacy
Her work was included in the 2019 exhibition City Of Women: Female artists in Vienna from 1900 to 1938 at the Österreichische Galerie Belvedere.

References

Further reading 
 Werner Fenz: Marie Egner 1850-1940. Landschaften, Blumenbilder. Exhibition catalog. Graz: Neue Galerie, 1979
 Martin Suppan: Marie Egner. Eine österreichische Stimmungsimpressionistin. Vol 1. Vienna: Galerie Suppan Fine Arts, 1981 (with diaries and memoirs) 
 Martin Suppan: Marie Egner. Eine österreichische Stimmungsimpressionistin. Vol 2. Vienna: Galerie Suppan Fine Arts, 1993 (with diaries and memoirs)

External links 

 Arcadja Auctions: More works by Egner
 
 Marie Egner Frauen in Bewegung @ Österreichische Nationalbibliothek
 Biography, Literature and Works by Marie Egner

1850 births
1940 deaths
19th-century Austrian painters
20th-century Austrian painters
19th-century Austrian women artists
20th-century Austrian women artists
Austrian women painters